The 2016 Grand Prix of Indianapolis, officially known as the 2016 Angie's List Grand Prix of Indianapolis for sponsorship reasons, was the fifth round of the 2016 IndyCar Series season. The race took place over 82 laps on the infield road course at Indianapolis Motor Speedway in Speedway, Indiana. The race also served as part of the festivities surrounding the 2016 Indianapolis 500. The car count for the race slightly increased from other races during the season due to some entries participating in the Indianapolis 500 electing to also run in the Grand Prix.

Race Recap

For the second race in a row, Simon Pagenaud qualified in pole position, this time with a time of 1:08.6868. Chip Ganassi Racing driver Charlie Kimball surprised with a qualifying run good enough to place him second. Graham Rahal and Josef Newgarden, who had qualified third and fifth respectively, had their times disallowed and were moved to the back of the starting grid for failing to meet minimum car weight regulations in post-qualifying inspection.

The race was run in cold temperatures and overcast skies. At the start, Simon Pagenaud held the lead, while James Hinchcliffe moved into second. As the field moved into the first turn, Tony Kanaan and Sébastien Bourdais made contact, bringing out a full course caution and bringing an end to Kanaan's day before he could complete a lap. The race restarted after four caution laps with much cleaner results. On lap six, Will Power lost control of his car entering turn seven while trying to defend from Alexander Rossi. No caution resulted from the spin and Power would finish a lowly 19th. The first round of pit stops came around lap 20. Graham Rahal would lead briefly due to extending fuel farther than anyone else, but would fall back following his own pit stop. The lead was briefly handed to Charlie Kimball, who had beat Pagenaud out of the pits. Pagenaud would not take long to find a way by, however, and was quickly back in the lead.

On lap 37, the second caution of the day came out when Sébastien Bourdais rolled to a halt on track. Most of the leaders pitted under the caution, but Hélio Castroneves and Conor Daly, who had made their first stops early and went off sequence from the leaders, stayed out, handing Castroneves the lead. On the restart, Daly was able to get by Castroneves and take the lead, which he held for 14 laps before coming in for his final pit stop. After Castroneves pitted two laps later, Simon Pagenaud resumed the lead and was able to gain enough of an advantage to not lose it again after his pit stop. Pagenaud took victory by roughly 4.5 seconds over his teammate Castroneves, giving Pagenaud his third consecutive victory and a comfortable lead in the point standings. James Hinchcliffe took the final step of the podium, coming across about half a second after Castroneves. Graham Rahal, despite starting at the back of the field, finished fourth. Despite fading in the last laps of the race, Conor Daly still placed a respectable sixth, making him the highest finishing rookie in the race.

Report

Qualifying

Source for individual rounds:

Race Results

Notes
All cars ran Dallara chassis with aerokits supplied by their respective engine manufacturer.

 Points include 1 point for leading at least 1 lap during a race, an additional 2 points for leading the most race laps, and 1 point for Pole Position.

Source for time gaps:

Championship standings after the race

Drivers' Championship standings

 Note: Only the top five positions are included.

References

External links
 Official Pit Stop Data
 Official Race Broadcast

Grand Prix of Indianapolis
2016 Grand Prix of Indianapolis
Grand Prix of Indianapolis